Milperra Bridge is a road bridge that carries Newbridge Road across the Georges River, located between Bankstown and , in South Western Sydney, New South Wales, Australia. The bridge is located adjacent to Henry Lawson Drive and the Bankstown Airport; and Newbridge Road serves as a continuation of Canterbury and Milperra Roads.

History
Prior to the bridge being built, there was no crossing of the Georges River between Moorebank and Milperra, though the road to Canterbury was built up to the east bank. The road over the Liverpool Weir and its later 1894 truss bridge went south east toward Wollongong and Engadine.

There was call for access between the two military settler camps, Moorebank and Milperra, to have access and a punt was proposed in the early 1920s.

The early design by the Department of Main Roads (DMR) showed a height above water of only  which was much decried by the locals, advising to the Dept that it be higher for the commercial and sporting interests of the area.

After long use, the old narrow bridge was not able to cope with the increase in traffic and was slated for replacement.

The current concrete structure supersedes the earlier truss bridge built circa 1930 as a wider and higher crossing of the river.

References

Road bridges in New South Wales
Bridges completed in 1965
1930 establishments in Australia
Concrete bridges in Australia
Bankstown, New South Wales
Liverpool, New South Wales
Georges River